William T. Calihan (May 1869 – December 20, 1917) was an American professional baseball player. He played for the Rochester Broncos in 1890 and the Philadelphia Athletics in 1891, both of the American Association.

Biography
Born in Oswego, Calihan had a brother named Tom who was a catcher in the minor leagues. In 1888, Calihan and his brother briefly formed a battery with Calihan's first professional baseball team, the minor-league Rochester Jingoes. Calihan had a 14–16 record with Rochester that year. The Rochester front office thought that Calihan drank excessively and presented behavioral issues. He ended up with the Buffalo Bisons during the 1889 season.

It looked as if Calihan might join Buffalo's team that was forming in the Players' League in 1890, but the team ultimately lost interest in Calihan. Instead, he entered the major leagues with the Rochester Broncos of the American Association that year. In one season with the Broncos, Calihan had an 18–15 win-loss record and appeared 12 times in the outfield. He spent his last major-league season (1891) with the Philadelphia Athletics, earning a 6–6 record in 13 games. In 50 games as a pitcher, his record was 24–21 with 42 complete games in 47 starts and an ERA of 4.14.  In 63 total games played he batted .158 with one home run, 18 RBI, and 22 runs scored.

Calihan remained in the minor leagues through 1898, mostly as an infielder. He married once, but his wife died in 1896 when he was playing in the minor leagues in Atlanta. Calihan died of pneumonia at the age of 48 in Rochester, New York.

References

External links
 Baseball Reference
 Retrosheet

19th-century baseball players
Baseball players from New York (state)
Major League Baseball pitchers
Major League Baseball outfielders
Rochester Broncos players
Philadelphia Athletics (AA 1891) players
1869 births
1917 deaths
People from Oswego, New York
Rochester Jingoes players
Buffalo Bisons (minor league) players
Rochester Flour Cities players
Albany Senators players
Syracuse Stars (minor league baseball) players
Atlanta Crackers players
Rochester Blackbirds players
Canandaigua Rustlers players
Lancaster Maroons players
Atlanta Colts players